Frank Andrew Lovejoy Jr. (March 28, 1912 – October 2, 1962) was an American actor in radio, film, and television. He is perhaps best remembered for appearing in the film noir The Hitch-Hiker and for starring in the radio drama Night Beat.

Early life
He was born in the Bronx, New York, but grew up in New Jersey. His father, Frank Andrew Lovejoy Sr., was a furniture salesman from Maine. His mother, Nora, was born in Massachusetts, to Irish immigrant parents.

Radio
A successful radio actor, Lovejoy played Broadway Harry on the Gay Nineties Revue and was heard on the 1930s crime drama series Gang Busters. Lovejoy was a narrator (during the first season) for the show This Is Your FBI.

In radio soap operas, Lovejoy played Dr. Christopher Ellerbe in Valiant Lady, Sam Foster in This Day Is Ours, and he had the roles of Brad Forbes on Brave Tomorrow and Larry Halliday in Bright Horizon. He also played the title character on the syndicated The Blue Beetle in 1940, several episodes of The Whistler, and starred in the later newspaper drama series Night Beat in the early 1950s and in episodes of Suspense in the late 1950s. He also starred as John Malone in The Amazing Mr. Malone.  He appeared as boxer Rory Malone in the March 20, 1949 episode of Pat Novak for Hire entitled "Rory Malone".

Films

Lovejoy mostly played supporting roles in films of the 1940s and 1950s. Appearing in movies such as Goodbye, My Fancy (1951) with Joan Crawford, and The Hitch-Hiker (1953) directed by Ida Lupino, Lovejoy was effective playing the movie's everyman in extraordinary situations. He was in several war movies, notably Stanley Kramer's Home of the Brave (1949), Breakthrough (1950), Joseph H. Lewis's Retreat, Hell! (1952) which portrayed the United States Marine Corps' withdrawal from the Chosin Reservoir (Changjin Reservoir) during the Korean War and as a Marine sergeant again in Beachhead (1954), and Strategic Air Command (1955) with James Stewart.

In 1950, he had the lead role in Try and Get Me (aka Sound of Fury) as a struggling, out-of-work man who fell to crime to support his family; in a film noir combining crime and murder with social injustice, an irresponsible newspaper and equally criminal public mob reactions. In 1951, he had the title role in I Was a Communist for the FBI with co-stars Ron Hagerthy, Paul Picerni, and Philip Carey.

Television
Lovejoy starred in two short-run TV series, Man Against Crime and Meet McGraw. Episodes of these two series have never been released commercially on DVD or VHS and never aired as reruns. Meet McGraw episodes were screened at the Mid-Atlantic Nostalgia Convention.

Lovejoy's final television performances include the episode "County General" (March 18, 1962) on the ABC series Bus Stop with Marilyn Maxwell in the role of Grace Sherwood. That same season, he appeared on the ABC crime drama Target: The Corruptors! about the efforts of a New York City reporter to expose organized crime.

Personal life
Lovejoy was first married to Frances Williams, but the couple divorced in the late 1930s. In 1940, Lovejoy married actress Joan Banks, with whom he had a son and a daughter. On October 2, 1962, Lovejoy died of a heart attack in his sleep at his residence in New York City. He and Joan at the time had been performing together in a New Jersey production of Gore Vidal's play The Best Man.

Filmography

References

External links 

 
 
 
 
 

1912 births
1962 deaths
American male film actors
American male radio actors
American radio personalities
American male television actors
American people of Irish descent
Male actors from New York City
People from the Bronx
20th-century American male actors